Mikhail Mikhailovich Ryzhov (born 17 December 1991) is a Russian race walker. He won the silver medal in the 50 kilometres walk event at the 2013 World Championships in Athletics in Moscow, Russia, but was disqualified for doping in 2015.

Doping case
In September 2015 IAAF confirmed that Ryshov was provisionally suspended after a sample from an out-of-competition control in Saransk in June had been found positive for a prohibited substance.

Competition record

References

External links 

1991 births
Living people
Russian male racewalkers
World Athletics Championships medalists
Universiade medalists in athletics (track and field)
Universiade silver medalists for Russia
World Athletics Race Walking Team Championships winners
Medalists at the 2011 Summer Universiade
Doping cases in athletics
Russian sportspeople in doping cases